List of Superior Generals of the Congregation of the Mission.

References

 
Congregation Mission